Arlington is a city in Fayette County, Iowa, United States. The population was 419 in the 2020 census, a decline from the 490 population in the 2000 census.

History
Arlington was originally called Brush Creek. The community was first settled in 1854.

Geography
Arlington is located at  (42.748095, -91.671545) just north of the headwaters of the Maquoketa River.

Demographics

2010 census
As of the census of 2010, there were 429 people, 191 households, and 122 families living in the city. The racial makeup of the city was 98.8% White, 0.7% Native American, 0.2% Asian, and 0.2% from two or more races.

There were 191 households, of which 27.7% had children under the age of 18 living with them, 51.8% were married couples living together, 8.4% had a female householder with no husband present, 3.7% had a male householder with no wife present, and 36.1% were non-families. 31.4% of all households were made up of individuals, and 16.7% had someone living alone who was 65 years of age or older. The average household size was 2.25 and the average family size was 2.79.

The median age in the city was 45.5 years. 20% of residents were under the age of 18; 8.9% were between the ages of 18 and 24; 20.6% were from 25 to 44; 32.2% were from 45 to 64; and 18.4% were 65 years of age or older. The gender makeup of the city was 49.4% male and 50.6% female.

2000 census
As of the census of 2000, there were 490 people, 212 households, and 140 families living in the city. The racial makeup of the city was 99.39% White, 0.41% Native American and 0.20% Asian.

There were 212 households, out of which 25.9% had children under the age of 18 living with them, 52.4% were married couples living together, 9.4% had a female householder with no husband present, and 33.5% were non-families. 30.2% of all households were made up of individuals, and 17.5% had someone living alone who was 65 years of age or older. The average household size was 2.31 and the average family size was 2.87.

In the city, the population was spread out, with 25.9% under the age of 18, 5.3% from 18 to 24, 22.4% from 25 to 44, 24.7% from 45 to 64, and 21.6% who were 65 years of age or older. The median age was 43 years. For every 100 females, there were 83.5 males. For every 100 females age 18 and over, there were 83.3 males.

The median income for a household in the city was $30,357, and the median income for a family was $37,083. Males had a median income of $25,938 versus $17,031 for females. The per capita income for the city was $14,643. About 11.9% of families and 14.9% of the population were below the poverty line, including 24.6% of those under age 18 and 12.5% of those age 65 or over.

Education
Arlington is served by Starmont Community School District that includes a high school, middle school and elementary school.

Transportation
Arlington is located on Iowa Highway 187.

Notable people

Percy R. Kelly (1870–1949) 26th Chief Justice of the Oregon Supreme Court
Brian Schoenjahn, Iowa State Senator from the 12th District
William Henry Thompson (1853–1937) United States Senator for the state of Nebraska

References

External links 

Welcome to Arlington A portal style website

Cities in Fayette County, Iowa
Cities in Iowa
1854 establishments in Iowa
Populated places established in 1854